Władysław Blin (Belor. Uladzіslaў Blіn, born May 31, 1954) was Bishop of the diocese of Vitebsk, the Catholic diocese centered in the city of Vitebsk (Belarus).

Life in Poland
He was born May 31, 1954 in Poland, in Świdwin (Western Pomerania) in a Polish family, which immigrated after World War II to post-war Poland from the town of Zadroże of the pre-war Wilno Voivodeship of Eastern Poland, annexed after the war by the Soviet Union (now Zadarožža, Hłybokaje District, Viciebsk Region). Later the family moved to the village of Ślesin, where Władysław Blin spent his childhood. Władysław Blin chosen path in life early Catholic priest. He was in Poland spiritual Catholic education, he graduated from the Higher Theological Seminary in Włocławek, in the same May 25, 1980 by Jan Zaręba, bishop of Włocławek, was ordained a priest. Władyslaw Blin continued his education at the Catholic University of Lublin and the Academy of Catholic Theology in Warsaw (now the University of Cardinal Stefan Wyszynski in Warsaw).

Living in Belarus
 
In 1989, when the Soviet Union lifted restrictions on religious life, he moved to the historic homeland of his family to Belarus, where he was appointed rector of the Catholic parish in Mahiloŭ.  He founded the first in the entire region of Mahiloŭ Catholic parish, the Church had secured the return of the church of the Ascension of the Virgin Mary and St. Stanislaus, where he became abbot. In 1998, he received a doctorate in theological science.  His doctoral work was devoted to St. Joseph. On October 13, 1999, he was appointed the first bishop of the newly formed diocese of Viciebsk, and was consecrated on November 20, 1999.  The principal consecrator was Cardinal Kazimierz Swiatek. As his episcopal motto, Blin chose the phrase Soli Deo.  On June 14, 2006 he was elected deputy chairman of the Conference of Catholic Bishops of Belarus. He is Chairman of the Ecumenical Commission and the Commission's general pastoral bishops in Belarus. The Pope accepted his resignation on February 25, 2013.

External links
 http://www.catholic.by/port/conference/blin.htm
 http://www.catholic-hierarchy.org/bishop/bblin.html
 http://www.gcatholic.org/dioceses/diocese/vite0.htm#3563
 http://www.kresy.pl/publicystyka?zobacz/bp-wladyslaw-blin-ordynariusz-diecezji-witebskiej
 http://www.diecezja.kalisz.pl/opiekun/215/A%20mieszka%C5%82em%20...%20na%20dworcu.htm

1954 births
Living people
People from Świdwin
John Paul II Catholic University of Lublin alumni
20th-century Polish Roman Catholic priests
21st-century Roman Catholic bishops in Belarus